"Lost" is the third single released by the Belgian dance group Lasgo after the addition of Jelle Van Dael as vocalist. The video was shot in Blackpool (UK). It started immediately to climb the national charts.

Track listing
CD Maxi-Single (Belgium and United States)
"Lost" (Radio Edit) – 2:58
"Lost" (Extended Mix) – 4:51
"Lost" (Jordy Lishious Remix) – 7:40

Chart performance

Weekly charts

Year-end charts

References

External links 

2009 singles
Lasgo songs
2009 songs
Songs written by Peter Luts
Songs written by Basto (musician)